Subak Raftar Express is a daily express train service between Lahore and Rawalpindi in Pakistan.

History
Subak Raftar means fast and speedy runner. The train has economy, AC lower, AC parlor and business class accommodation.

In 2012, it was reported that the train has lost its popularity after the launch of Margalla Express.

Subak Raftar Express 
The Pakistan Railway has designated the Subak Raftar Express with the UP designation of 101, running from Lahore Junction to Margala Rawalpindi, and DN designation of 102, traveling from Rawalpindi to Lahore. The train commences in Lahore and makes stops at various stations including Gujranwala, Wazirabad, Gujrat, Lalamusa Junction, Jehlum, and Gujar Khan before reaching its final destination in Rawalpindi.

Stations
It has following train stops:

 Lahore Junction
 Gujranwala
 Wazirabad Junction
 Gujrat
 Lalamusa Junction
 Jhelum
 Gujar Khan
 Rawalpindi

References 

Named passenger trains of Pakistan
Passenger trains in Pakistan
Rail transport in Punjab, Pakistan